The Canada International Scientific Exchange Program, usually known as CISEPO is a Canadian-based global charitable organization that promotes peace and medical collaboration.

History 
CISEPO was founded in 1984 by Arnold Noyek M.D., with an initial focus on addressing hereditary deafness.

The organization received Government of Canada funding to implement newborn hearing screening in Jordan in 2007.

The organization was awarded the Canadian Red Cross Power of Humanity Award in 2004, presented to CISEPO by Rania Al-Abdullah.

CISEPO is a member of CanWaCH.

Activities 
CISEPO promotes peace, with a focus on the Middle East, and facilitates academic exchanges between healthcare facilities and universities. Activates take place in the Middle East, South-East Asia, Northern America, Western and Eastern Europe, South America, and Australasia. Partnering healthcare establishments include Mount Sinai Hospital, the University of Toronto, Sir Mortimer B. Davis Hewish General Hospital, McGill University, the Baycrest Centre for Geriatric Care, McMaster University and the Royal College of Physicians and Surgeons of Canada.

CISEPO provides residency training to Palestinian doctors in Israeli hospitals both to improve learning and to create links to help foster peace.

CISEPO has produced 25 chapters for textbooks, produced 500 publications, including 250 peer-reviewed publications, and undertaken over 250 guest lectures. CISEPO provides one and two-year fellowships to foreign medical students in Canada.

Activities are funded by corporate donations, research grants, and the Saul A. Silverman Family Foundation.

Key people 

 Harvey Skinner M.D., chair of the board
 Shawna Novak M.D., Executive Director

References

External links 

 Official website

1984 establishments in Canada
Organizations based in Toronto
Medical and health organizations based in Ontario